Utraan  is a 2020 Tamil language film directed by  Rajaghajini and stars Roshan Udhayakumar, Heroshini Komali, and Priyanka Nair in the lead roles. P. Ravishankar,  Madhusudhan Rao, and Vela Ramamoorthy play pivotal roles.

Synopsis 
Utraan begins with two college students, a guy and a girl, falling in love at a men’s college. The girl’s father, a cop, tries to separate them with the help of a dreaded goon. How they protect their relationship is the rest of the story.

Cast 

 Roshan Udayakumar as Vijay
 Heroshini Komali
 Priyanka Nair as Kamali
 P. Ravishankar as Principal
 Madhusudhan Rao as Ganesha Moorthi (Inspector)
 Vela Ramamoorthy as VVK
 Florent Pereira  as Arivudainambi
 Aaru Bala
 Imman Annachi
 Jangiri Madhumitha
 Kothandam as Tea stall owner
 Supergood Subramani as Police Officer
 Porali Dhilipan as Lawyer
 Saravana Sakthi
 Cheran Raj 
 Kadhal Saravanan 
 Angadi Theru Sindhu 
 Gaana Sudhakar
 Sulakchana 
 Thavasi 
 Premapriya

Production 
Heroshini Komali, known for her mimicry, made her Tamil debut with this film. She plays the daughter of a police officer.  Madhusudhan Rao and Vela Ramamoorthy play negative roles while P. Ravishankar plays an important role. Priyanka Nair, who is known for her role in Veyil, plays a college lecturer in the film. Singer Gaana Sudhakar appears in a supporting role in the film.

Soundtrack 
The songs were made by N. R. Raghunanthan.

"Varatchiya Vadiniruntha" - Gaana Sudhakar
"Kadhale Venandi" - Sudharshan Ashok
"Yaarivano" - Kapil Nair, Sanjana Kalmanje
Getha Thookkividu - Dhivakar Santhosh, Velu
"Kalar Kalara" - Harihara Sudhan, Syed Subaan
"Super Chudithaaru" - Gaana Sudhakar

Release 
The Times of India praised the performances of Roshan Udhayakumar and Madhusudhan Rao. However, the reviewer gave the film one out of five stars and wrote "The already wafer-thin plot is made worse by weak screenplay, unpleasant characters and a bizarre climax". Maalaimalar and Dina Thanthi praised the songs and cinematography.

References

External links